Palaeagrotis is a genus of moths of the family Noctuidae.

Species
 Palaeagrotis inops (Lederer, 1853)

References
Natural History Museum Lepidoptera genus database
Palaeagrotis at funet

Noctuinae